Vichitravirya is a character in the Mahabharata, where he is featured as a Kuru king.

According to the Hindu epic, he is the younger son of Queen Satyavati and King Shantanu, and the de jure grandfather of the Pandavas and the Kauravas. He is also the half-brother of Krishna Dvaipayana Vyasa and Bhishma.

Literature

Mahabharata 
Vichitravirya has an elder brother named Chitrāngada, whom his half-brother Bhishma placed on the throne of the kingdom of the Kurus after Shantanu's death; he is a mighty warrior, but the king of the Gandharvas defeats and kills him at the end of a long battle. Thereafter, Bhishma consecrates Vichitravirya, who is still a child, as the new king.

When he had reached manhood, Bhishma marries him to Ambika and Ambalika, the beautiful daughters of the king of Kashi. Vichitravirya loves his wives very much, and is adored by them. But after seven years, he falls ill of consumption, and could not be healed despite the efforts of his friends and physicians. Like his brother Chitrangada, he dies childless. Subsequently, through a niyoga relationship with his half-brother sage Vyasa, his wives and a maid give birth to three children, namely Dhritarashtra, Pandu, and Vidura.

Different texts share different stories surrounding the death of Vichitravirya. According to the Bhagavata Purana, he dies of a heart attack because of his attachment to his wives, Ambika and Ambalika. Vichitravirya was succeeded by Pandu and later Dhritrashtra.

Historicity 
A historical Kuru King named Dhritarashtra, son of Vichitravirya, is mentioned in the Kathaka Samhita of the Yajurveda ( 1200–900 BCE) as a descendant of the Rigvedic-era King Sudas of the Bharatas.

See also
 Dhritarashtra
 Pandu
 Vidura
 Chitrāngada
 Bhishma
 Historicity of the Mahabharata

References

Bibliography 

 Vicitravirya in: M.M.S. Shastri Chitrao, Bharatavarshiya Prachin Charitrakosh (Dictionary of Ancient Indian Biography, in Hindi), Pune 1964, p. 841
 J.A.B. van Buitenen, Mahabharat, vol. 1, Chicago 1973

External links
 Persons and Stories from Mahabharata

Characters in the Mahabharata
Hindu monarchs